Fedor Andreevich Kobylin, byname "Koshka" ("the Cat") (died 1407), was the youngest son of Andrei Ivanovich Kobyla and progenitor of the Romanov dynasty and Sheremetev family.

He was a senior boyar in the Duma of Dmitri Donskoi and his son Vasili I of Russia. According to some sources, Koshka governed Moscow during Dmitry's absence in the Battle of Kulikovo. In 1393, he was recorded as negotiating with Novgorod for peace. 

His cautionary approach towards the Tatars was praised by Edigu in his 1407 letter to Vasili I. It is believed that Fyodor died about that date. His daughters Anna and Akulina married a Prince of Rostov and Prince of Mikulin, while his granddaughter Maria married Yaroslav of Borovsk, father-in-law of Vasili II of Russia. He had three sons: Ivan Fyodorovich Koshkin, Fedor Fedorovich Koshkin, and Alexander Fyodorovich Koshkin.

Notes

References

House of Romanov
Kobylin, Fedor
Year of birth unknown